Pete Snodden (born Peter Scott Snodden, 11 June 1980) is a radio host on Cool FM from Bangor, Northern Ireland.

Personal life
Snodden is the son of Jackie Snodden (c1929-2014). Snodden met his future wife at the University of Ulster in Coleraine in 2000 and proposed in 2006 on the London Eye. He is married to Julia Snodden and together they have two daughters, Ivana Snodden and Elayna Sophia Snodden. He plays hockey for his hometown, Bangor and enjoys playing football and golf. He is also an ambassador for The Unite Against Hate Campaign, The Prince's Trust and Action Cancer. In 2012, he carried the Olympic torch for the 2012 Olympics.

Career
From 1999 until 2011 Pete was involved with Cool FM's specialist music output and hosted various dance music programmes. Snodden began hosting The Pete Snodden Breakfast Show on Cool FM in 2004. The show ran until 2 November 2012, ending as Snodden wanted to spend mornings with his daughter and the fact he needed a new challenge as his show had set numerous records while it was on air. Snodden hosted "Snodden Show" on Cool FM which is in the afternoons from 1pm to 4pm while the Breakfast Show was hosted by Gareth Stewart and Connor Phillips. Snodden returned to the Breakfast Show in 2014 after the departure of Connor Phillips. Snodden hosts the show from 6am to 10am along with Paulo Ross and Rebecca McKinney. The show is now called Pete Snodden in the Morning. In August 2020, Pete rode his bike to the studio, and also rode it around the inside the Cool FM building.

Awards
His programme, ‘The Source’ won the Most Informative Media award at the 2006 NI Dance Music Awards. He was also Media Personality of the Year at the 2008 FATE Awards and Media Personality of the Year at the GO Awards 2009. In addition, Pete was also nominated as a finalist at the 2008 Ulster Tatler People of the Year Awards in the category of Celebrity of the Year, but lost out to actor Jimmy Nesbitt.

References
 

1980 births
People from Bangor, County Down
Living people
Radio DJs from Northern Ireland